In Britain, the National Union of Labour and Socialist Clubs (NULSC) is a socialist society representing Working men's clubs affiliated to the Labour Party (many are also affiliated to the Working Men's Club and Institute Union).

References

Clubs and societies in the United Kingdom
Working men's clubs
Labour Party (UK) socialist societies